Statistics Denmark is a Danish governmental organization under the Ministry of the Interior and Housing and which reports to the Minister of Economic and Internal Affairs. The organization is responsible for creating statistics on the Danish society, for example employment statistics, trade balance, and demographics.

Statistics Denmark makes large use of public registers in the statistical production. Population censuses have been produced entirely from registers since 1981.

StatBank is a large statistical database maintained by the central authority of statistics in Denmark. Online distribution of statistics has been a part of the dissemination strategy in Denmark since 1985. It is updated every day at 9.00 am (CET) and contains all new statistics. The statistics can be presented as cross-tables, diagrams or maps. The output can be transferred to other programs for further compilation. There is also a Danish version.

History 

Statistics in Denmark has a long history; the first population census in Denmark was conducted in 1769.

Statistics Denmark was founded in January 1850, following the introduction of democracy to Denmark, as the "Statistical Bureau".

In 1966, the Danish Parliament adopted the Act on Statistics Denmark; this act changed the name of the Statistical Bureau to Statistics Denmark and defined its status as an independent institution.

Role of Statistics Denmark
Statistics Denmark provides information to politicians, other decision-makers, the general public, scholars, etc.

Centralised production of statistics
The production of statistics in Denmark is highly centralised. Statistics Denmark is responsible for ensuring that the overall statistical picture is complete and coherent regardless of the source. The main office is located in Copenhagen and this is where almost all of the 560 people employed by Statistics Denmark work.

Independence: The cornerstone of statistics
The Act on Statistics Denmark gives an independent Board of Directors the responsibility to determine the institution's work programme, thus allowing Statistics Denmark to operate independently of government control.

Access to data is secured under the Act
The Act on Statistics Denmark grants access to the basic data necessary to produce the statistics. The Act states that public authorities must supply the information they possess when requested to do so by Statistics Denmark. Decisions on this must be settled by the Board. The private sector is also obliged to supply certain information for statistical purposes.
The last population census was conducted in 1970. Censuses are now exclusively based on administrative registers private citizens now only participate in surveys on a voluntary basis.
In accordance with these principles, Statistics Denmark has striven to develop a statistical system which is almost entirely based on the administrative registers of other public offices. Other collection methods are employed where necessary, but are only regarded as a supplement.

Data banks
Statistics Denmark's electronic data bank (Statbank.dk) is available free-of-charge in Danish or English for any user. It includes almost all statistics produced in-house. When new general statistics are published in News from Statistics Denmark, the same data are made available at the same time from the data bank but in a far more detailed form.

Customised service projects
Since the collected data normally offers opportunities to make other combinations and distributions than those published or provided through standard assignments, Statistics Denmark also undertakes special customised projects.

International Co-operation
Statistics Denmark actively participates in international statistical activities. Denmark takes part in the joint European statistical programme.

As a member of the EU, Denmark participates in a binding agreement on the compilation, preparation and dissemination of statistics. Although the requirements on statistical output coincide, to a certain extent, with Denmark's national needs, considerable resources are devoted to the fulfilment of Danish obligations.

Statistics Denmark is also actively involved in the United Nations Statistical Commission, the Conference of European Statisticians (CES), the Organisation for Economic Cooperation and Development, the International Monetary Fund, and the International Labour Organization.

Technical co-operation

Statistics Denmark has an International Consulting division, which co-ordinates technical co-operation. This unit initially focused its activities on transition countries in Central and Eastern Europe, but has gradually widened both the scope of its activities and the range of countries with which it is involved.

References 

Government agencies of Denmark
Denmark